West Jiading is a station on Line 11 of the Shanghai Metro.

References 

Railway stations in Shanghai
Shanghai Metro stations in Jiading District
Line 11, Shanghai Metro
Railway stations in China opened in 2009